Stéphane Haccoun (born 31 August 1967 in Paris, France) is a former southpaw French boxer.

He fought as a featherweight, a super featherweight, and a junior lightweight.

In preparation to compete for the European Featherweight title, he defeated Fabrice Benichou on 3 June 1993, at the Palais de Sport in Marseille, winning in a ten round points decision.

Taking the EBU Featherweight title
On 24 September 1993, he defeated Mauricio Stecca for the EBU European Feather Title at the Marseille's Palais de Sports in a ninth round technical knockout.

He competed unsuccessfully for the IBF World Featherweight title against Tom "Boom Boom" Johnson, losing in a ninth round knockout, on 30 November 1993 at the Palais de Sports in Marseille.  Johnson easily won every round, using his superior speed, reach and ability, to dominate the bout with direct rights and hard left jabs. He scored the knockdown 1 minute and 15 seconds into the ninth. 

He relinquished the EBU Featherweight title on 22 March 1994, losing to Stephano Zoff in Charleroi, Belgium in a ninth round technical knockout.

See also
List of select Jewish boxers

References

Link
 

1967 births
Living people
Featherweight boxers
Jewish boxers
Jewish French sportspeople
Boxers from Paris
French male boxers